Celestial is the debut album by American post-metal band Isis, released in 2000 by Escape Artist and Hydra Head Records. It is their third "official" solo release and first full length.

A year later, Isis released SGNL>05, an EP designed to act as an extension to Celestial; its tracks were all directly culled from the Celestial recording sessions. Frontman Aaron Turner describes them as being “part of the same whole”, separated from each other because releasing a double album for the group's first full-length may have been overbearing for listeners.

In addition to the regular CD and vinyl LP editions, Celestial is available in a double release, coupled with its sister EP, SGNL>05. On June 5, 2013, it was announced that Celestial would be re-issued by Ipecac Recordings with new artwork from Turner, as well as the audio having been recently remastered by James Plotkin.

Themes
Turner has acknowledged that the album deals with the erosion of privacy as technology advances, in a similar vein to 2004's Panopticon; however, he states that the theme is dealt with in a “more primitive way” on Celestial. Towers are described as ‘thematic’ material by Decibel'''s Joe Gross.

ReceptionCelestial was named the 53rd-finest metal record of the decade by Decibel, stating that "it's seen as a transitional record between the band's early work and the post-metal benchmarks such as Oceanic, but Celestial holds up in ways different from their later work [...] the elements of the greatness are present, but rawer, more direct." Rock Sound placed it at #3 in their rundown of their top albums of 2001 and Metal Hammer'' named it one of the 20 best metal albums of 2000. In 2011, William York, writing for Allmusic, described the album as Isis' best, and argues that the record needs to be “given time” – that it eventually develops an “almost epic feel”.

Track listing

Personnel 

Band members
 Jeff Caxide – bass
 Aaron Harris – drums
 Michael Gallagher – guitar
 Bryant Clifford Meyer – electronics, guitar, vocals on "Gentle Time"
 Aaron Turner – vocals, guitar, art and graphic construction

Other personnel
 Matt Bayles – producing, audio recording and audio mixing
 Jason Hellmann – video stills
 Dave Merullo – mastering and audio editing

References

External links 
 Celestial at Bandcamp (streamed copy where licensed)

2000 debut albums
Isis (band) albums
Hydra Head Records albums
Concept albums
Albums produced by Matt Bayles
Albums with cover art by Aaron Turner
Ipecac Recordings albums